HMCS Antigonish was a  that served in the Royal Canadian Navy from 1944–1946 and as a  from 1957–1966. She is named for Antigonish, Nova Scotia. Her photo is featured on the cover of the 1994 album Frigate by the band April Wine.

Antigonish was ordered 1 February 1943 as part of the 1943–44 River-class building programme. She was laid down by Yarrows Ltd. at Esquimalt on 2 October 1943 and launched 10 February 1944. She was commissioned at Esquimalt into the RCN on 4 July 1944 with the pennant K661.

Background

The River-class frigate was designed by William Reed of Smith's Dock Company of South Bank-on-Tees. The first orders were placed by the Royal Navy in 1940 and the vessels were named for rivers in the United Kingdom, giving name to the class. In Canada they were named for towns and cities though they kept the same designation. The name "frigate" was suggested by Vice-Admiral Percy Nelles of the Royal Canadian Navy and was adopted later that year.

Improvements over the corvette design included improved accommodation which was markedly better. For underwater targets, the River-class frigate was equipped with a Hedgehog anti-submarine mortar and depth charge rails aft and four side-mounted throwers.

River-class frigates were the first Royal Canadian Navy warships to carry the 147B Sword horizontal fan echo sonar transmitter in addition to the irregular ASDIC. This allowed the ship to maintain contact with targets even while firing unless a target was struck. Improved radar and direction-finding equipment improved the RCN's ability to find and track enemy submarines over the previous classes.

Service history

After transiting to Halifax, from which she required some minor repairs, Antigonish was sent to Bermuda to work up. Upon her return she was assigned to EG 16. She remained with the unit for the rest of the European war, making a couple of trips to Gibraltar. In December 1944, with Antigonish as Senior Officer's Ship, EG 16 was deployed to Canadian waters for operations.

Antigonish returned to Canada in June 1945 and began a tropicalization refit at Pictou, Nova Scotia on 1 July. This refit was completed on 17 November. She was ordered to Esquimalt where she was paid off into the reserve on 5 February 1946.

Post-war service
Antigonish was reactivated in 1947 for use as a training ship until 1954. In January 1952,  and Antigonish deployed on a training cruise to South America along the Pacific coast, making several port visits. In May, Antigonish and Beacon Hill travelled to Juneau, Alaska and in August, to San Diego on training cruises.

She was one of twenty-one River-class frigates chosen to undergo conversion to a Prestonian-class frigate which gave her a flush-decked configuration and required the enlargement of her bridge and the heightening of her funnel. This also required the enclosing the quarterdeck in order to house the two Squid anti-submarine mortars.  She was converted in 1956–1957 and was recommissioned with pennant 301 on 12 October 1957. During service with the Fourth Canadian Escort Squadron she was fitted with a midship deckhouse to provide classroom and training facilities for officer candidates. In January 1960, Antigonish and three other Prestonian-class ships made a tour of South American ports, visiting San Diego, Balboa, the Galapagos Islands, Callao and Valparaíso, Talara and Long Beach. Antigonish was a member of the Fourth Canadian Escort Squadron based out of Esquimalt, British Columbia. In June 1960 the Fourth Canadian Escort Squadron performed a training tour of the Pacific, with stops at Yokohama, Japan, Midway Atoll and Pearl Harbor. They returned to Canada in August. She remained in a training role until she was paid off by the RCN on 30 November 1966. She was sold for scrap and broken up in Japan in 1968.

Ship's bell
The ship's bell of HMCS Antigonish is currently held by the Maritime Museum of British Columbia. The Christening Bells Project at Canadian Forces Base Esquimalt Naval and Military Museum includes information from the ship's bell of HMCS Antigonish, which was used for baptism of babies on board the ship.

See also
 List of ships of the Canadian Navy

References

Citations

Sources

External links
 Antigonish Heritage Museum – HMCS Antigonish 

 

River-class frigates of the Royal Canadian Navy
1944 ships
Ships built in British Columbia